St James'  is a Gaelic Athletic Association club based in the Doughiska area of the city of Galway in Ireland. The club is a member of the Galway GAA. Underage teams up to U-16's play in the Galway league and championships while they compete at higher levels as well. The club has had much success in recent years winning back to back Minor A County Championships in 2006 & 2007, as well as two Minor A West Board titles in the same years. They finished top of the Minor League in 2006. At Intermediate level, the club narrowly missed out on the 2006 and 2009 county titles. These victories indicated the future was certainly bright for the club, and in 2010, won the Galway Intermediate Championship, beating An Spidéal in the final, and also defeating Carna-Caiseal in the semi finals, after two replays. They progressed to win the Connacht Club Intermediate Championship, and from there beat Gneevguilla of Kerry in the All-Ireland Intermediate Club semi-final in Mallow, County Cork. St James' faced Lisnaskea Emmets of Fermanagh in the All Ireland intermediate club football final in Croke Park, on 12 February 2011.

Honours
 Galway Minor Football Championships: 3
 2006, 2007, 2009
 Galway Intermediate Football Championships: 1
 2010
 Connacht Intermediate Club Football Championships: 1
 2010

Notable players

Gaelic football clubs in County Galway
Gaelic games clubs in County Galway
Sport in Galway (city)